Alice Cooper: Live at Montreux 2005 is a live video and album release by Alice Cooper. It was released worldwide in May 2006 as a combined DVD and CD package. In 2014 it was issued as a limited double vinyl release for Record Store Day under the title 'Live In Switzerland 2005'.

The concert was filmed and recorded on July 12, at the 2005 Montreux Jazz Festival in Montreux, Switzerland, at the Stravinski Auditorium, as part of Cooper's "Dirty Diamonds" World Tour.

Track listing

DVD/Blu-ray
 Opening credits – 0:16
 "Department of Youth" – 2:40
 "No More Mr. Nice Guy" – 3:04
 "Dirty Diamonds" – 3:45
 "Billion Dollar Babies" – 3:34
 "Be My Lover" – 3:18
 "Lost in America" – 4:31
 "I Never Cry" – 2:50
 "Woman of Mass Distraction" – 3:53
 "I'm Eighteen" – 4:14
 "Between High School and Old School" – 2:51
 "What Do You Want from Me?" – 3:19
 "Is It My Body?" – 3:00
 "Go to Hell" – 2:56
 "The Black Widow" (instrumental) – 2:54
 "Drum Solo" (Instrumental) – 3:10
 "Gimme" – 2:59
 "Feed My Frankenstein" – 3:22
 "Welcome to My Nightmare" – 2:57
 "The Awakening" – 4:14
 "Steven" – 1:47
 "Only Women Bleed" – 3:46
 "Ballad of Dwight Fry"–4:03
 "Killer" – 2:24
 "I Love the Dead" – 2:23
 "School's Out" – 4:59
 "Poison" – 4:52
 "Wish I Were Born in Beverly Hills" – 3:09
 "Under My Wheels" – 4:40
 Closing credits – 1:24

CD
 "Department of Youth" – 2:40
 "No More Mr. Nice Guy" – 3:04
 "Dirty Diamonds" – 3:43
 "Billion Dollar Babies" – 3:25
 "Be My Lover" – 3:17
 "Lost in America" – 4:21
 "I Never Cry" – 2:45
 "Woman of Mass Distraction" – 3:46
 "I'm Eighteen" – 4:11
 "Between High School and Old School" – 2:53
 "What Do You Want from Me?" – 3:16
 "Is It My Body?" – 2:51
 "Gimme" – 2:57
 "Feed My Frankenstein" – 3:38
 "Welcome to My Nightmare" – 2:35
 "School's Out" – 4:36
 "Poison" – 4:42
 "Wish I Were Born in Beverly Hills" – 3:11
 "Under My Wheels" – 4:12

Personnel 

 Thierry Amsallem – director
 Venus Barr – dancer, "Vampire", "Dominatrix"
 Paul Bassett – "Henchmen", stage technician
 Andrée Buchler – coordination, post producer
 Gilbert Cara – sound engineer
 Alice Cooper – lead vocals
 Calico Cooper – dancer, "The Nurse", "Whipdancer", backing vocals
 Calvin Cooper – dancer
 Chuck Garric – bass, backing vocals
 Eric Glardon – post producer, video
 Angella Grossi – dancer, "Seductress"
 Michael Heatley – liner notes
 Claire Higgins – production coordination
 Rosie Holley – associate producer, producer
 Damon Johnson – guitar, keyboards, backing vocals
 Geoff Kempin – executive producer
 Chris Leahy – "Henchmen", stage technician
 Randy Meullier – sound engineer
 Claude Nobs – executive producer
 Pat Nowak – "The Controller", "Executioner", "Henchmen", backing vocals, props
 David Richards  – mixing
 Jean Ristori – post producer
 Ryan Roxie – guitar, backing vocals
 Melissa Roy – associate producer, producer
 Terry Shand – executive producer
 Eric Singer – drums, backing vocals
 André Vouilloz – production coordination
 Abbi Welch – production coordination

Certifications

References

Alice Cooper live albums
Albums recorded at the Montreux Jazz Festival
2006 live albums
Live video albums
2006 video albums